In mathematics, Zeckendorf's theorem, named after Belgian amateur mathematician Edouard Zeckendorf, is a theorem about the representation of integers as sums of Fibonacci numbers.

Zeckendorf's theorem states that every positive integer can be represented uniquely as the sum of one or more distinct Fibonacci numbers in such a way that the sum does not include any two consecutive Fibonacci numbers.

      
where  is the th Fibonacci number. The Fibonacci coding of  can be derived from its Zeckendorf representation.

For example, the Zeckendorf representation of 64 is

.

There are other ways of representing 64 as the sum of Fibonacci numbers

but these are not Zeckendorf representations because 34 and 21 are consecutive Fibonacci numbers, as are 5 and 3.

For any given positive integer, its Zeckendorf representation can be found by using a greedy algorithm, choosing the largest possible Fibonacci number at each stage.

History
While the theorem is named after the eponymous author who published his paper in 1972, the same result had been published 20 years earlier by Gerrit Lekkerkerker. As such, the theorem is an example of Stigler's Law of Eponymy.

Proof

Zeckendorf's theorem has two parts:

Existence: every positive integer  has a Zeckendorf representation.
Uniqueness: no positive integer  has two different Zeckendorf representations.

The first part of Zeckendorf's theorem (existence) can be proven by induction. For  it is clearly true (as these are Fibonacci numbers), for  we have . If  is a Fibonacci number then we're done. Else there exists  such that . Now suppose each positive integer  has a Zeckendorf representation (induction hypothesis) and consider . Since ,  has a Zeckendorf representation by the induction hypothesis. At the same time,  (we apply the definition of Fibonacci number in the last equality), so the Zeckendorf representation of  does not contain , and hence also does not contain .

The second part of Zeckendorf's theorem (uniqueness) requires the following lemma:

Because  and  contain no common elements, . Without loss of generality, suppose . This contradicts the fact that  and  have the same sum, and we can conclude that either  or  must be empty.

Now assume (again without loss of generality) that  is empty. Then  has sum 0, and so must . But since  can only contain positive integers, it must be empty too. To conclude:  which implies , proving that each Zeckendorf representation is unique.

Fibonacci multiplication
One can define the following operation  on natural numbers , :  given the Zeckendorf representations
 and  we define the Fibonacci product 

(The product is not always in Zeckendorf form.  For example)

A simple rearrangement of sums shows that this is a commutative operation; however, Donald Knuth proved the surprising fact that this operation is also associative.

Representation with negafibonacci numbers
The Fibonacci sequence can be extended to negative index  using the rearranged recurrence relation

which yields the sequence of "negafibonacci" numbers satisfying

Any integer can be uniquely represented as a sum of negafibonacci numbers in which no two consecutive negafibonacci numbers are used.  For example:

 
 
 
 
 0 is represented by the empty sum.

, for example, so the uniqueness of the representation does depend on the condition that no two consecutive negafibonacci numbers are used.

This gives a system of coding integers, similar to the representation of Zeckendorf's theorem. In the string representing the integer , the th digit is 1 if  appears in the sum that represents ; that digit is 0 otherwise.   For example, 24 may be represented by the string 100101001, which has the digit 1 in places 9, 6, 4, and 1, because .  The integer  is represented by a string of odd length if and only if .

See also
 Complete sequence
 Fibonacci coding
 Fibonacci nim
 Ostrowski numeration

References

External links

Zeckendorf's theorem at cut-the-knot

Fibonacci numbers
Theorems in number theory
Articles containing proofs